Elms Hotel may refer to:

 Elms Hotel (Excelsior Springs, Missouri), listed on the NRHP in Missouri
 Elms Hotel (Abilene, Kansas), listed on the NRHP in Kansas